is a Japanese politician, a Liberal Democrat member of the House of Councillors in the Diet (national legislature) who was elected for the first time in 2007 and re-elected in 2010 in Okinawa Prefecture constituency. Shimajiri was appointed the Minister of State for Okinawa and Northern Territories Affairs in the cabinet reshuffle on October 7, 2015, and is one of 3 women serving in Shinzo Abe's cabinet.

In an interview following her appointment as the minister of state, Shimajiri stated that she will not deal with issues regarding the construction of new U.S. military facilities in Okinawa.

Shimajiri lost her Diet seat to former Ginowan, Okinawa mayor Yoichi Iha, a critic of the US military presence in Okinawa supported by a coalition of opposition parties, in the 2016 Japanese House of Councillors election. This was viewed by some analysts as a setback for the proposed relocation of Futenma.

References

External links 
 [shimajiriaiko.ti-da.net/ Official website] in Japanese.
 House of Councillors of Japan website

Members of the House of Councillors (Japan)
Female members of the House of Councillors (Japan)
Lehman Brothers
Sophia University alumni
People from Sendai
Living people
1965 births